Doug Hamilton (March 6, 1963 – March 9, 2006) was president and general manager of the Los Angeles Galaxy. He was previously the general manager of Miami Fusion F.C. Hamilton died from a heart attack aboard an airplane while traveling from San José, Costa Rica to Los Angeles, California.

Hamilton was raised in Hazlet, New Jersey, and attended St. Benedict School, and then later, Raritan High School, both in Hazlet, New Jersey. He attended the University of North Carolina at Greensboro and played for the men's soccer team that won two NCAA Division III championships. He then served four years as head coach of the men's soccer team at Greensboro College. Raritan High School holds a tournament every year in honor of him. He had a son named Aedan and a wife named Paige.

Hamilton won the Major League Soccer Executive of the Year award three straight times, 2003–2005. On March 15, 2006, the league renamed that award the Doug Hamilton Executive of the Year Award.

References

1963 births
2006 deaths
American soccer chairmen and investors
LA Galaxy
Major League Soccer executives
Miami Fusion
People from Hazlet, New Jersey
UNC Greensboro Spartans men's soccer players
Association footballers not categorized by position
Association football players not categorized by nationality